Balışıh railway station is a railway station in Balışeyh, Turkey. The station was originally opened on 20 November 1925 by the Anatolian—Baghdad Railways and was one of the first railway stations built by the newly formed Republic of Turkey.

TCDD Taşımacılık operates two daily intercity trains from Ankara to Kurtalan, and Tatvan,

References

External links
Kırıkkale station timetable
Kırıkkale station timetable

Railway stations in Kırıkkale Province
Railway stations opened in 1925
1925 establishments in Turkey